The Zhanjiang Bay Bridge, is a cable-stayed bridge that crosses the harbour in Zhanjiang, Guangdong, China. The bridge's main span of  ranks it among the largest cable-stayed bridges in the world.

See also
 List of largest cable-stayed bridges
 List of tallest bridges in the world

References

External links

http://www.iis-system.com/12901/8322.html

Cable-stayed bridges in China
Bridges in Guangdong
Bridges completed in 2006